The Abernethy pearl, also known as the Little Willie pearl, is a  freshwater pearl discovered in the River Tay of Perth, Scotland in 1967. The pearl is named after its discoverer, William Abernethy (1925–2021). It was previously known as Bill's pearl.

The Abernethy pearl was produced by a mussel belonging to the species Margaritifera margaritifera. It is spherically shaped and coloured white with a slightly pink overtone.

The pearl was reportedly valued at £10,000 in 1967. It is now displayed at the A&G Cairncross in Perth.

References 

Individual pearls